John Blanke (also rendered Blancke or Blak) (fl. 1501–1511) was a musician of African descent in London from the early Tudor period, who probably came to England as one of the African attendants of Catherine of Aragon in 1501. He is one of the earliest recorded black people in United Kingdom after the Roman period. His name may refer to his skin colour, derived either from the word "black" or possibly from the French word "blanc", meaning white.

Background
Historian Onyeka Nubia has written about John Blanke's possible origins in his 2013 book Blackamoores: Africans in Tudor England, their Presence, Status and Origins. and in two articles. One is "Tudor Africans: What's in a Name?" in October 2012 for History Today magazine and the other is "The Missing Tudors. Black People in 16th Century England" for the BBC History Magazine, published in July 2012.

Little is known of Blanke's life, but he was paid 8 pence per day by King Henry VII. A surviving document from the accounts of the Treasurer of the Chamber records a payment of 20 shillings to "John Blanke the Blacke Trumpet" as wages for the month of November 1507, with payments of the same amount continuing monthly through the next year. He successfully petitioned Henry VIII for a wage increase from 8d to 16d. 

Dr Sydney Anglo was the first historian to propose that the "Blanke Trumpet" in the 1507 court accounts was the same as the black man depicted twice in the 1511 Westminster Tournament Roll, in a footnote to an article about the Court Festivals of Henry VII. The Westminster Tournament Roll is an illuminated, 60-foot manuscript now held by the College of Arms; it recorded the royal procession to the lavish tournament held on 12 and 13 February 1511 to celebrate the birth of a son, Henry, Duke of Cornwall (died 23 February 1511), to Catherine and Henry VIII on New Year's Day 1511. John Blanke is depicted twice, as one of the six trumpeters on horseback in the royal retinue. All six of the trumpeters wear yellow and grey livery and bear a trumpet decorated with the royal arms; Blanke alone wears a brown and yellow turban, while the others are bare-headed with longish hair. He appears a second time in the roll, wearing a green and gold head covering.

Black trumpeters and drummers were documented in other Renaissance cities, including a trumpeter for the royal ship Barcha in Naples in 1470, a trumpeter recorded as galley slave of Cosimo I de' Medici, Grand Duke of Tuscany in 1555, and black drummers in the court of King James IV in Edinburgh.

Commemoration
British rapper and novelist Akala, based a character in his book "The Dark Lady" on John Blanke, released in 2021.

In January 2022 a Nubian Jak blue plaque was installed in John Blanke's honour at King Charles Court, home to Trinity Laban Conservatoire of Music and Dance's Faculty of Music at the Old Royal Naval College in Greenwich, London.

In May 2022 an exhibition The Tudors: Passion, Power and Politics at the Walker Art Gallery displayed Blanke's two portraits on the Westminster Tournament Roll in public for the first time in 20 years. It was the first time the document was shown outside London.

References

Further reading
David Bindman, Henry Louis Gates, Jr., Karen C. C. Dalton, The Image of the Black in Western Art: pt. 1. From the 'age of discovery' to the age of abolition: artists of the Renaissance and Baroque, Volume 3, Part 1 of The Image of the Black in Western Art; Harvard University Press, 2010, p. 236
Imtiaz H. Habib, Black Lives in the English Archives, 1500–1677: Imprints of the Invisible, Ashgate Publishing, 2008, p. 39
Miranda Kaufmann, "John Blanke, the Trumpeter", in Black Tudors: The Untold Story, Oneworld Publications, 2017, pp. 7–31
K. J. P. Lowe, Black Africans In Renaissance Europe, Cambridge University Press, 2005, p. 39
Marika Sherwood, "Blacks in Tudor England", History Today, Volume: 53 Issue: 10

External links
"Blanke, John (16th Century)", BlackPast.org
"Britain's first black community in Elizabethan London", BBC News, 20 July 2012.
"John Blanke-A Black Trumpeter in the court of King Henry VIII", The Black Presence in Britain, 12 March 2009
"John Blanke, Black Trumpeter", Black Presence: Asian and Black History in Britain, National Archives
"The Black Trumpeter at Henry VIII's Tournament", National Archives
"Pay Day for John Blanke", National Archives
"Black Moors in Scotland", National Archives
The John Blanke Project

16th-century African people
16th-century English musicians
Black British musicians
English trumpeters
Household of Catherine of Aragon
Male trumpeters
People of the Tudor period